The crucian carp (Carassius carassius) is a medium-sized member of the common carp family Cyprinidae. It occurs widely in northern European regions. Its name derives from the Low German karusse or karutze, possibly from Medieval Latin coracinus (a kind of river fish).

Distribution
The crucian carp is a widely distributed European species, its range spanning from England to Russia; it is found as far north as the Arctic Circle in the Scandinavian countries, and as far south as central France and the region of the Black Sea.  Its habitat includes lakes, ponds, and slow-moving rivers. It has been established that the fish is native to England and not introduced.

They are broadly described as having a body of "golden-green shining color", but a more precise source states that young fish are golden-bronze but darken with maturity, until they gain a dark green back, deep bronze upper flanks, and gold on the lower flanks and belly, and reddish or orange fins, although other colour variations exist. One distinguishing characteristic is a convexly rounded fin, as opposed to goldfish (or C. gibelio) hybrids which have concave fins.

The crucian carp is also the type species for the genus, which has led to confusion in the taxonomy of species native to East Asia.

There are reports of hybridisation between the crucian and domestic or feral goldfish, which has been verified by production of viable hybrids in laboratory conditions. Although the hybrids thus produced were sterile or nearly so, genetic contamination of the native population has been raised as a concern; even if the hybrids cannot continue to propagate, the F1 hybrids exhibit hybrid vigour or heterosis, being much more adept at finding food and evading predators than either of their parents, which has been proposed to constitute a possible threat to the native crucian carp population.

Predator defenses 
The variation in shape of a crucian carp can be very high. When cohabiting waters where predatory fish are present, there occurs an induced change in the morphology of the population from a sleek-bodied form to a deep-bodied form, which makes it difficult for predator fish to fit the crucian carp within its jaws. However, because the deep-bodied morph is not permanent, it is expected that the trait might have some survivability trade-offs in the absence of predators. Notably, the deep-bodied morph is associated with compromised immune function and resource allocation. Specifically, deep-bodied crucian carp have a lower level of baseline natural antibodies relative to the sleeker-bodied morphs. In addition, crucian carp with the deep-bodied morphology exhibit reduced growth rates when compared to their sleeker-bodied counterparts.

Physiology
Carassius species exhibit some remarkable physiological adaptations to their environment. For example, in entirely anoxic conditions during winter Carassius carassius can survive for considerable periods by anaerobic respiration, with ethanol as the major metabolic end product; a facility that is highly unusual among vertebrates. During summer the fish also may survive anaerobic conditions by this metabolic expedient, though only to a far more limited extent; the winter phenotype can sustain fermentation as a substitute for respiration for several weeks on end. Experimentally the fish have been maintained under anoxic conditions for 140 days. Anoxia can be tolerated longest in the coldest water, even down to 0 °C, because colder conditions lower the metabolic rate. Alcohol production occurs mainly in the muscle tissues, but also in the liver, where the process is thought to have originated. Similarly goldfish can produce alcohol in muscle tissues, but to a much more limited extent.

Experimentally it has been demonstrated that the metabolic process involves the production of pyruvate from lactate, followed by decarboxylation to acetaldehyde which then is hydrogenated to ethanol as the major metabolic end product. In turn the fish largely excretes the ethanol into the water rather than accumulating it to toxic levels in the tissues. Excretion of lactate in significant quantities is not a common nor a desirable metabolic facility, but the excretion of ethanol presents no serious metabolic challenges. This metabolic expedient avoids the fatal accumulation of acid end-products of anaerobic glycolysis.

Sport fishing
In Britain, leisurely or competitive catching of this fish by rod and tackle belong in the coarse fishing category. The British rod-caught record for largest crucian is four pounds, nine ounces, (2.085 kg) landed by Martin Bowler in 2003, tied by Joshua Blavins in 2011. There have been various bids for a breakage of this record since, but they were rejected as not "true" crucians" but rather, e.g. a "brown goldfish variant" (i.e., hybrid born between the non-native goldfish or gibelo species and the British crucian). In the Netherlands, a typical crucian specimen of 54 cm, weighing 3 kg has been caught and photographed.

Relation to goldfish

Some sources state that the goldfish (Carassius auratus) is a cultivated breed of crucian carp taken from the wild.

Aside from confusion in nomenclature, there is the practical issue of distinguishing true crucian carp from goldfish hybrids in, e.g., competitive coarse fishing. The following is based on a similar table of guidelines constructed by the Farnham Angling Society:

Use

These carp are also occasionally kept as freshwater aquarium fish, as well as in water gardens, although they are not commonly available commercially, mainly because they are not in particularly high demand due to the presence of more colourful fish such as the koi or orfe.

It has been suggested that this is a heavily farmed fish worldwide; FAO's newest statistics from 2008 (pub. 2011) shows total production C. Crassius at 1,957,337 tonnes, worth US$2,135,857,000, ranked 9th in worldwide in aquaculture, including marine fish and crustaceans, however this statistics treats the Asian C. gibelio carp as a subspecies of the European crucian carp, and it is evident that the greater bulk of this number is from the Asian fish farmed in China.

In terms of freshwater catches of C. crassius (read Carassius spp.), FAO's 2006 statistics show 5.53 thousand tons harvested, which ranked 13th worldwide among freshwater fishes caught. The breakdown was Kazakhstan 2.2, Japan 1.12, Serbia 0.84, Moldova 0.19, Uzbekistan 0.19, Poland 0.13. In these figures, the tonnage from European countries may represent C. crassius in some part.

In Poland, crucian carp is considered the best-tasting pan fish, and traditionally served with sour cream (karasie w śmietanie).
King's carp (previously Galician carp as in Galicia in the Austro-Hungarian Empire) – the breed of carp created in Poland, the "hump" is bigger than average and the scales are larger than average. Carp is included amongst the holiday foods in Poland. The tradition might have Jewish origins.

In Russia, this particular species is called Золотой карась meaning "golden crucian", and is one of the fish used in a borscht recipe called borshch c karasej (Борщ с карасе́й) or borshch c karasyami (Борщ с карася́ми). Another classic Russian recipe - fried crucians in sour cream. The variety of lake Nedzheli is highly appreciated in Yakutia and has been introduced to other lakes in the region.

References

 
 
 

(Fishing industry)
 
 

(angling)
 : says as of Dec 2011, Bowler, Yateley lake, Surrey 2003 and to Blavins, Verulam AC club lake, Herts, 2011, ties at 4 lb. 4 oz., 0dr. But on the same site, British Records (rod-caught) Fish Committee page,  BRFC Coarse Fish Record Listings(PDF (as of 05/12/2011)): gives a slightly different weight: Bowles 4 lb. 4 oz. 9 dr., 2.085 kg record.
  A catch at  "5 lb 14oz .. was.. likely.. not a true Crucian as the same angler later submitted an even larger fish.. as a National Record, but it was dismissed as a Brown Goldfish variant. (The comparison chart seems to have flipped the correct usage of convex/concave)

(culinary)

External links

 Fact sheet, taxonomic details, distribution maps, slideshow, and images of Carassius carassius at ZipcodeZoo.com.
 
 Fish Holds Breath for Months
 How carp 'hold their breath' through winter - New Scientist

crucian carp
crucian carp
Freshwater fish of Europe
Freshwater fish of Asia
Polish cuisine
Russian cuisine
Commercial fish
crucian carp
crucian carp